Amphimasoreus is a genus of ground beetles in the family Carabidae. This genus has a single species, Amphimasoreus amaroides. It is found in Israel, Lebanon, Syria, and Turkey.

References

Platyninae